World History Group is a magazine publishing company headquartered in Leesburg, Virginia. It was founded in 2006 as Weider History Group by Eric Weider, the son of fitness entrepreneur Ben Weider (and nephew of Joe Weider) and current President of Schiff Nutrition International. The Weider History Group publishes 11 titles reaching 600,000 readers. It operates HistoryNet.com, a website that contains daily features, photo galleries, and articles published in various magazines. The Weider History Group was acquired by private equity firm Regent, L.P. in 2015 and was renamed the World History Group. Regent formed the publisher Archetype in 2019 for its media holdings.

List of publications

Print 
 America's Civil War
 American History
 Aviation History
 Civil War Times
 MHQ: The Quarterly Journal of Military History
 Military History
 Vietnam Magazine
 Wild West
 World War II

Defunct 
 British Heritage (new publisher apparently Kliger Heritage)

References

2006 establishments in Virginia
American companies established in 2006
Mass media in Virginia
Publishing companies established in 2006